Marquay is a commune in the Dordogne department in Nouvelle-Aquitaine in southwestern France.

Population

See also
 Château de Puymartin
 Venus of Laussel, discovered in Marquay
 Communes of the Dordogne department

References

Communes of Dordogne